Passport to Danger may refer to:

Books
Passport to Danger is the title of two novels featuring the Hardy Boys: 
Passport to Danger (Nancy Drew/Hardy Boys), a 1993 crossover novel set in Mexico
Passport to Danger (Hardy Boys), a 2003 mystery novel set in Paris
Passport to Danger by Mary Richmond (novelist) 1938

Film and TV
Passport to Danger (TV series) with Cesar Romero 1954–1958